The Irish Monarchist Society was a minor organisation active in the 1930s which sought to overthrow the Irish Free State and establish an independent Irish Catholic monarchy under a member of the O'Neill dynasty.

References

Organisations based in the Irish Free State
Monarchist organizations
Monarchism in Ireland